The National Board of Review of Motion Pictures is a non-profit organization of New York City area film enthusiasts.  Its awards, which are announced in early December, are considered an early harbinger of the film awards season that culminates in the Academy Awards.

Origins
The organization which is now a private organization of film enthusiasts has its roots in 1909 when Charles Sprague Smith and others formed the New York Board of Motion Picture Censorship to make recommendations to the Mayor's office concerning controversial films. It quickly became known as the National Board of Motion Picture Censorship. In an effort to avoid government censorship of films, the National Board became the unofficial clearinghouse for new movies. The Board's stated purpose was to endorse films of merit and champion the new "art of the people", which was transforming America's cultural life. In March 1916 the Board changed its name to the National Board of Review of Motion Pictures to avoid the controversial word "censorship". 

Producers submitted their films to the board before making release prints; they agreed to cut any footage that the board found objectionable, up to and including destroying the entire film. Thousands of films carried the legend "Passed by the National Board of Review" in their main titles from 1916 into the 1950s, when the board began to lose financial support, partly due to the NBR being overshadowed by the MPAA regarding film censorship.

In 1930, the NBR was the first group to choose the 10 best English-language movies of the year and the best foreign films, and is still the first critical body to announce its annual awards. In 1936 executive secretary Wilton A. Barrett explained the Board's workings:The National Board is opposed to legal censorship regarding all forms of the motion picture...It believes that far more constructive ...is the method of selecting the better pictures, publishing descriptive, classified lists of them and building up audiences and support for them through the work of community groups...

About
Since 1909, the National Board of Review has dedicated its efforts to the support of cinema as both art and entertainment. Each year, this select group of film enthusiasts, filmmakers, professionals and academics view over 250 films and participates in illuminating discussions with directors, actors, producers and screenwriters before announcing their selections for the best work of the year.  Since first citing year-end cinematic achievements in 1929, NBR has recognized a vast selection of outstanding studio, independent, foreign-language, animated and documentary films, often propelling recipients such as Peter Farrelly’s Green Book and George Miller’s Mad Max: Fury Road into the larger awards conversation. NBR also stands out as the only film organization that bestows a film history award in honor of former member and film historian William K. Everson. In addition, one of the organization’s core values is identifying new talent and nurturing young filmmakers by awarding promising talent with ‘Directorial Debut’ and ‘Breakthrough Actor’ awards as well as grants to rising film students and by facilitating community outreach through the support of organizations such as The Ghetto Film School, Reel Works Teen Filmmaking, and Educational Video Center. With its continued efforts to assist up-and-coming artists in completing and presenting their work, NBR honors its commitment to not just identifying the best that current cinema has to offer, but also ensuring the quality of films for future generations to come.

Publications
The NBR has also gained international acclaim for its publications: Film Program (1917–1926); Exceptional Photoplays (1920–1925); Photoplay Guide to Better Movies (1924–1926); National Board of Review Magazine (1926–1942); New Movies (1942–1949); and Films in Review, which published its first issue in 1950.

Films in Review
The board's official magazine had existed in several forms and different names since its inception. In 1950, the magazine changed its name from Screen Magazine and launched the first issue as Films in Review on February 1, 1950. Films in Review ceased print publishing in 1997 and became an online publication only at Filmsinreview.com. It is the oldest film review and commentary publication in the United States.

Award categories

 Best Film + Top 10 Films
 Best Director
 Best Actor
 Best Actress
 Best Supporting Actor
 Best Supporting Actress
 Best Acting by an Ensemble
 Breakthrough Performance
 Best Adapted Screenplay
 Best Original Screenplay
 Best Animated Film
 Best Documentary Film
 Best Foreign Language Film
 Spotlight Award
 Best Family Film
 Top 5 Documentaries
 Best Directorial Debut
 Best Animated Feature
 Top 10 Independent Films
Special Recognition 
 Best Juvenile Performance
 NBR Freedom of Expression
 Special Filmmaking Achievement
 Top Five Foreign Language Films
 Special Achievement in Producing
 William K. Everson Film History Award
 Career Achievements in Production: Cinematography, Music, FX

See also 
 Motion Picture Production Code

References

External links
 

 
American film critics associations
Organizations established in 1909
1909 establishments in New York City